Copa de Elite is a 2014 Brazilian parody film for release on April 17, 2014 directed by Victor Brandt produced by GLAZ and distributed by 20th Century Fox. The cast consists of Marcos Veras, Júlia Rabello, Rafinha Bastos, Anitta among others.

The film is a satire of Brazilian successes films as Se Eu Fosse Você (2006), Tropa de Elite (2007), Chico Xavier (2010), Bruna Surfistinha (2011) and Minha Mãe é uma Peça (2013) with main focus on the then upcoming 2014 FIFA World Cup, which was hosted by Brazil.

Cast

References

External links

2010s parody films
Brazilian parody films
2014 films
2014 comedy films
Body swapping in films